The second season of Sword Art Online, titled Sword Art Online II, is an anime series adapted from the light novel series of the same title written by Reki Kawahara and illustrated by Abec. It was produced by A-1 Pictures, and directed by Tomohiko Itō. It is divided into the story arc "Phantom Bullet" which adapts volume 5 and 6 and in the Side Stories "Calibur" and "Mother's Rosario" which are respectively adapted from volume 7 and 8 of the light novel. The episodes are each 23 minutes in length and adapts Kawahara's light novels from the fifth through the seventh volumes as well as parts of the eighth volume. The story of the second season follows Kazuto "Kirito" Kirigaya as he plays the new virtual reality game called "Gun Gale Online" (GGO), where he allies himself with a girl named Shino "Sinon" Asada and enters a tournament to investigate a player known only as "Death Gun", who has the ability to kill a person in the real world by killing their virtual avatar. Kirito and his friends return to "Alfheim Online" (ALO) to retrieve the Holy Sword Excaliber from Thrym, the King of the Frost Giants, in order to restore the city of Jötunheimr back to its former glory. Asuna befriends a girl named Yuuki Konno, leader of the Sleeping Knights, who asks Asuna to join them in one last quest together. However, Asuna later discovers that Yuuki is suffering from a terminal illness and does not have very long to live.

This 24-episode series initially ran in Japan from July 5 to December 20, 2014 on Tokyo MX with later airings on Chiba TV, tvk, Teleball, GYT, GTV, MBS, TVA, TVh, TVQ and BS11. The series was made available as a worldwide simulcast by Aniplex. It was also picked up by Crunchyroll for online simulcast streaming in North America and other select parts of the world. Daisuki allowed users to stream the series in select European countries.

Five pieces of theme music are used for this series. The first opening theme is "Ignite" performed by Eir Aoi. The first ending theme is "Startear" performed by Luna Haruna. Since the "Calibur" arc, the second opening theme is "Courage", which is performed by Asuna Yuuki's voice actress, Haruka Tomatsu, while the second ending theme is "No More Time Machine", which is performed by LiSA, and the third ending theme is "Shirushi", also sung by LiSA.


Episode list

Sword Art Online II

Sword Art Offline II

Media release

Japanese release

Notes

References

External links
Official anime website 
Official website 
Official Adult Swim website

Sword Art Online episode lists
2014 Japanese television seasons
I